Lycimna is a monotypic moth genus of the family Erebidae. Its only species, Lycimna polymesata, is found in the north-eastern Himalayas, Borneo, Sumatra and Java. Both the genus and the species were first described by Francis Walker in 1860.

References

Calpinae
Monotypic moth genera